The Dongola or Dongolawi is an African breed of riding horse. It is predominantly of Barb type, though there may have been some Arab influence in the past. It originated in the Dongola province of Sudan, for which it is named. In eastern Africa it is distributed in the northern part of Sudan and in western Eritrea; it is also present in several West African countries including Cameroon, Chad and the Central African Republic. A number of local West African breeds or types derive from it; they may be regarded as sub-types, or may be reported as separate breeds.

History 

Regional variants of the Dongola include:
 the West African Dongola in Cameroon and the Central African Republic, usually dark or black with extensive white markings to the legs and sometimes to the belly
 the Bornu of north-eastern Nigeria
 and the Haoussa or Hausa in northern Nigeria and parts of Niger.

A number of local West African breeds or types derive from cross-breeding Dongola and Barb stock; they may be regarded as sub-types of the Barb or of the Dongola, or may be reported as separate breeds. They include:
 in Burkina Faso, the Mossi and, in the northern part of the country, the Yagha or Liptako
 in central Niger, the Djerma, a light horse seen in dark coat colours

Characteristics 

The Dongola usually has a convex profile.

References

Horse breeds